Majid Mohamed Al-Ali Sultan (born September 29, 1987 in Kuwait City is a Kuwaiti judoka, who competed in the men's heavyweight category. He achieved a fifth-place finish as a 14-year-old teen in the over-100 kg division at the 2002 Asian Games in Busan, South Korea, and also represented his nation Kuwait at the 2004 Summer Olympics.

Al-Ali qualified as a lone judoka for the Kuwaiti squad in the men's heavyweight class (+100 kg) at the 2004 Summer Olympics in Athens, by granting a tripartite invitation from the International Judo Federation. He lost his opening match to U.S. judoka and two-time Olympian Martin Boonzaayer, who successfully scored an ippon, and gripped him with a tate shiho gatame (vertical four-quarter) hold at two minutes and twenty-one seconds.

References

External links
 

1987 births
Living people
Kuwaiti male judoka
Olympic judoka of Kuwait
Judoka at the 2004 Summer Olympics
Judoka at the 2002 Asian Games
Sportspeople from Kuwait City
Asian Games competitors for Kuwait